Hillside railway station served the village of Hillside, Angus, Scotland from 1883 to 1927 on the North British, Arbroath and Montrose Railway.

History 
The station opened as Hill Side on 1 May 1883 by the Caledonian Railway. The signal box, which opened before the station, opened in 1881. To the northeast is a goods yard, which later became Hillside Distillery. Its name was changed to Hillside in 1910. The station closed in February 1927.

References

External links 
Railscot on Hillside [NB station]

Disused railway stations in Angus, Scotland
Former North British Railway stations
Railway stations in Great Britain opened in 1883
Railway stations in Great Britain closed in 1927
1883 establishments in Scotland
1927 disestablishments in Scotland